Pyrgiscus ninettae is a species of sea snail, a marine gastropod mollusk in the family Pyramidellidae, the pyrams and their allies.

References

External links
 To World Register of Marine Species
 P. Bartsch (1915), Report on the Turton collection of South African marine mollusks, with additional notes on other South African shells contained in the United States National Museum; Bulletin of the United States National Museum v. 91 (1915)

Pyramidellidae
Gastropods described in 1996